Saiful Islam  (born 14 August 1963) is a British chemist and professor of Materials science at the University of Oxford. Previously he was professor of materials chemistry at the University of Bath.  Saiful is a Fellow of the Royal Society of Chemistry (FRSC) and a Fellow of the Institute of Materials, Minerals and Mining (FIMMM).In 2020, he received the American Chemical Society Award for Energy Chemistry for his major contributions to the fundamental atomistic understanding of new materials for lithium batteries and perovskite solar cells.

Early life and education
Saiful was born in 1963 in Karachi, Pakistan to ethnically Bengali parents. The family moved to London in 1964 and he grew up in Crouch End, north London. There he went to Stationers' Company's School, a state comprehensive. He received both a BSc degree in chemistry and a PhD (1988) from University College London, where he studied under Professor Richard Catlow. Subsequently, he held a postdoctoral fellowship at the Eastman Kodak laboratories in Rochester, New York, working on oxide superconductors.

Career and Research 
Saiful returned to the UK in 1990 to become a lecturer, then reader, at the University of Surrey. In January 2006 he was appointed professor of Materials Chemistry at the University of Bath.

His research interests lie in the field of clean energy materials, especially new materials for next generations of lithium batteries, solid-state batteries and perovskite solar cells. His group applies computational methods combined with structural techniques to study fundamental atomistic properties such as ion conduction, defect chemistry and surface structures.

He has been a member of the editorial board of the Journal of Materials Chemistry, and sits on the advisory board of the RSC journal Energy and Environmental Science. He is Principal Investigator of the Faraday Institution's 'CATMAT' project on Next-generation Lithium-Ion Cathode Materials.

He presented the 2016 Royal Institution Christmas Lectures, entitled "Supercharged: Fuelling the Future" on the theme of energy, a commemorative lecture series for the BBC which celebrated 80 years since the Christmas Lectures were first broadcast on television in 1936. The lectures were broadcast on BBC Four, and achieved over 3.5 million interactions through the BBC broadcasts and social media. Saiful was interviewed before these lectures for articles in The Guardian. A demonstration in these lectures led to a Guinness World Record for the highest voltage (1,275V) produced by a fruit battery using more than 1,000 lemons.

Saiful has served on the Diversity Committee of the Royal Society, and was selected for the Royal Society's 'Inspiring Scientists' project that recorded the life stories of British scientists with minority ethnic heritage in partnership with National Life Stories at the British Library. His outreach activities include talks on energy materials to student audiences  using 3D glasses organised by the TTP Education in Action at the UCL Institute of Education, London.  He was interviewed for The Life Scientific programme on BBC Radio 4 in October 2019.

Personal life
Saiful lives in Bath with his wife, Dr Gita Sunthankar (a local GP), and their two children, Yasmin and Zak.

In 2019, he declined a New Year Honours Award of an OBE. He is an atheist and Patron of Humanists UK.

Awards and honours

Saiful is a Fellow of the Royal Society of Chemistry (FRSC) and a Fellow of the Institute of Materials, Minerals and Mining (FIMMM).

He has received several RSC research awards including the 2017 Peter Day Award for Materials Chemistry, 2013 Sustainable Energy Award, 2011 Materials Chemistry Division Lecturer Award and 2008 Francis Bacon Medal for Fuel Cell Science. He was a 2013 recipient of the Royal Society Wolfson Research Merit Award. From the American Chemical Society, he received the 2020 Award for Energy Chemistry.

References

Living people
1963 births
British chemists
Academics of the University of Bath
Academics of the University of Oxford
Academics of the University of Surrey
Alumni of University College London
British atheists
People from Crouch End
Fellows of the Royal Society of Chemistry
British humanists
Computational chemists
20th-century British chemists
21st-century British chemists
British people of Bangladeshi descent
Solid state chemists
Fellows of the Institute of Materials, Minerals and Mining